Igor Anatolyevich Shkolik (born 9 January 2001) is a Russian football player. He plays as a central midfielder for FC Neftekhimik Nizhnekamsk on loan from  FC Dynamo Moscow.

Club career
He made his debut in the Russian Premier League for FC Dynamo Moscow on 16 July 2020 in a game against FC Ufa, substituting Oscar Hiljemark at half-time. He made his first starting lineup appearance on 19 July 2020 in a game against FC Krasnodar.

On 18 June 2021, he joined FC Rotor Volgograd on loan. On 8 July 2022, Shkolik was loaned to FC Neftekhimik Nizhnekamsk.

Career statistics

References

External links
 
 
 

2001 births
People from Severodvinsk
Sportspeople from Arkhangelsk Oblast
Living people
Russian footballers
Russia youth international footballers
Association football midfielders
FC Dynamo Moscow players
FC Rotor Volgograd players
FC Neftekhimik Nizhnekamsk players
Russian Premier League players
Russian First League players
Russian Second League players